Beaver Lake is a 158 acre (64 ha) reservoir in Anderson County, Kentucky. Created in 1963, it is owned by the Kentucky Department of Fish and Wildlife Resources.

References

External links
Beaver Trail Fishing Tournament Annual fishing tournament located on Beaver Lake in Anderson County Kentucky.

1963 establishments in Kentucky
Protected areas of Anderson County, Kentucky
Buildings and structures in Anderson County, Kentucky
Reservoirs in Kentucky
Bodies of water of Anderson County, Kentucky